This is a list of secondary schools in Midlands Province in Zimbabwe, sorted by district.

Chirumhanzu District 

 Chamakanda Secondary School
 Chengwena Secondary School
 Chishuku Secondary School
 Chizhou Secondary School
 Driefontein High School
 Gonawapotera Secondary School
 Lalapanzi Secondary School
 Leopold Takawira High School
 Hama Secondary School
 Hillview Secondary School
 Holy Cross High School
 Mapiravana Secondary School
 Mukomberanwa Secondary School
 Mushandirapamwe Secondary School
 Mutenderende Secondary School
 New England Secondary School
 Orton's Drift Secondary School
 Rambakombwa Secondary School
 Siyahokwe Secondary School
 Upfumba Secondary School

Gokwe North District 

 Chinyenyetu High School
 Chireya High School
 Chisina Secondary School
 Chomuuyo Secondary School
 Copper Queen Secondary School
 Denda Secondary School
 Dukaupfu Secondary School
 Gandavaroyi Secondary School
 Gumunyu Secondary School
 Mbovhana Secondary School
 Musadzi Secondary School
 Nembudziya Rural Government Secondary School
 Nyamazengwe Secondary School
 Nyamuroro Kubatana Secondary School 
 Sumbe Secondary School
 Tanda Secondary School
 Tare Secondary School
 Tongwe Secondary School

Gokwe South District 

 Bengwe Secondary School
 Chevecheve High School
 Cheziya Gokwe High School
 Chidoma Secondary School
 Chitombo Secondary School
 Defe Secondary School
 Ganye Secondary School
 Gawa Secondary School
 Gomoguru Secondary School
 Gukure Secondary School
 Gwamure High School
 Hovano Secondary School 
 Kana Secondary School
 Kasango Secondary School
 Kasuwe Secondary School
 Kushinga-Rumhuma Secondary School
 Logos Empowerment Girls High School
 Mateme Secondary School
 Mateta 2 Secondary School
 Mateta Rujeko Secondary School
 Marimasimbe Secondary School
 Machakata Secondary School
 Mapfungautsi Secondary School
 Masuka Secondary School
 Mkoka Secondary School
 Muchadei Secondary School
 Nemangwe Secondary School
 Ngomeni Secondary School
 Njelele Secondary School
 Nyaje Secondary School
 Nyaradza Secondary School
 Nyoka Secondary School
 Sai Secondary School
 Sasikari Tanda Secondary School
 Sengwa High School
 Sunganai Secondary School
 St. Paul's Gokwe High School

Gweru District 

 Ascot Secondary School
 Anderson Adventist High School
 Chaplin High School
 Fletcher High School
 Guinea Fowl High School
 Gunde High School
 Lingfield Christian Academy
 Loreto High School
 Lower Gweru Adventist High School
 Maboleni Secondary School
 Mambo High School
 Matinunura High School
 Mdubiwa Secondary School
 Midlands Christian College
 Mkoba 1 High School
 Mkoba 3 High School
 Nashville Secondary School
 Nhlangano Secondary School
 Nkululeko High School
 Ntabamhlope Secondary School
 Regina Mundi High School
 Sacred Heart College (Zimbabwe)  
 Senka Secondary School
 Sibomvu High School
 Sikombingo Secondary School
 St. Patrick's High School
 Tangwena Secondary School 
 Thornhill High School
 Vungu Secondary School
 Whata Secondary School

Kwekwe District 

 Amaveni High School
 Batanai High School
 Bee Mine Secondary School
 Bhamhara Secondary School
 Camelot College
 Drake Secondary School
 Donjane Secondary School
 Dosa Secondary School
 Fatima High School
 Globe & Phoenix Secondary School
 Goldridge College
 Kwekwe High School
 Loreto High School
 Manunure High School
 Mbizo High School
 McFadden High School
 Ntombankala Secondary School 
 Ntobe Secondary School
 Nyaradzo Secondary School
 Rio Tinto Zhombe High School
 Rujeko High School 
 Rutendo High School
 Samambwa Secondary School
 Sidakeni Secondary School
 Shungu High School
 Silobela High School
 Tombankala Secondary School
 Totororo Secondary School
 Wozoli Secondary School

Mberengwa District 

 Bayayi Secondary School
 Chapungu Secondary School
 Chegato High School
 Chegute High School
 Chemimwe Secondary School
 Chingoma Secondary School
 Chizungu High School
 Chomusenda Secondary School
 Chouragu Secondary School
 Chovuragu Secondary School
 Dekeza Secondary School
 Funye Secondary School
 Guruva Secondary School
 Mabika Secondary School
 Madenyika Secondary School
 Makuva High School
 Maringambizi Secondary School
 Masase High School
 Matabo Secondary School
 Mataruse Secondary School
 Mavorovondo Secondary School
 Mbuya Nehanda High School
 Mketi Secondary School 
 Mnene High School
 Mposi Secondary School
 Murerezi Secondary School
 Musume High School
 Rengwe Secondary School
 Ruzengwe Secondary School
 Svita Secondary School
 Vubwe Secondary School
 Vurasha High School
 Vuronga Secondary School
 Vutika Secondary School
 Vutsanana Secondary School
 Zvamagwiro Secondary School
 Zvamatohwe Secondary School
 Zvavashe Secondary School
 Zverenje Secondary School
 Zvomukonde Secondary School

Shurugwi District 

 Batanai Secondary School
 Bokai Secondary School
 Chikwingwizha Secondary School 
 Chironde-Kwagweya Secondary School
 Chrome High School
 Chivakanenyanga Secondary School
 Dombotombo Secondary School
 Dorset Secondary School 
 Gamwa Secondary School 
 Gare High School
 Gato High School
 Hanke Adventist High School
 Ihwerehwenga Secondary School
 Juchuta Secondary School 
 Kushinga High School
 Mupangayi Secondary School 
 Nyamakari Secondary School
 Pakame High School
 Parkinson High School
 Rusununguko Secondary School
 Sibolise Secondary School,
 Shiku Secondary School
 Shurugwi 2 High School
 Svika High School 
 Takunda Secondary School
 Tongogara High School
 Zhaugwe Secondary School
 Zviumwa Secondary School

Zvishavane District 

 Bera Secondary School
 Chachitsa Secondary School
 Dadaya High School
 Dambudzo Secondary School
 Govarizadze Secondary School
 Korogwe High School
 Mabasa Secondary School
 Mandava High School
 Musikati Secondary School
 Ngomeyebani Secondary School
 Nyatsime College
 Utongani Secondary School
 Wasima Secondary School
 Zvishavane High School

Former schools 

 Emerald Hill School for the Deaf (founded in Kwekwe and moved to Harare in 1979)

See also 
Logos Girls High School.
 List of schools in Zimbabwe

References 

Education in Midlands Province
Midlands Province

Schools, Midland Province